Twicetagram is the debut and first Korean studio album by South Korean girl group Twice. It was released on October 30, 2017, by JYP Entertainment and distributed through Genie Music. The title Twicetagram refers  to their official Instagram account of the same name.

The group's first full-length album features a total of 13 tracks, supported by its lead single "Likey" which was composed by Black Eyed Pilseung and Jeon Gun, marking the group's fourth collaboration with Black Eyed Pilseung. Several composers and songwriters participated in the album's production, including the Korean members of Twice as lyricists, and former Wonder Girls' member Hyerim who co-wrote and co-composed the eighth track titled "Look at Me".

The album received positive reception from several critics, and was also a commercial success for the group, reaching sales of over 320,000 copies and becoming the best-selling Korean girl group album in 2017. With the album and its lead single both debuting atop the Billboard World Albums and World Digital Song Sales charts respectively, Twice became the first female K-pop act to simultaneously top both charts. A reissue of Twicetagram, titled Merry & Happy, was released on December 11, 2017.

Background and release 
It was first reported by media outlets on September 8, 2017, that Twice had begun shooting a music video for an upcoming song in Canada. JYP Entertainment confirmed the reports on the same day but stated that the exact date for the group's comeback was still undecided. On September 25, the agency gave further details about the group's upcoming music release which was slated in late October, though the exact date was still undecided. 

On October 15, a surprise trailer for the upcoming album was shown to fans during the second day of the group's two-day fan meeting titled "Twice Fanmeeting: ONCE Begins"—a commemoration of the two year anniversary of their debut. It was officially announced on the next day that their comeback was scheduled on October 30 with the release of Twice's first full-length album named Twicetagram, a social media-inspired album with the title being a reference to the group's official Instagram account of the same name, and its title track titled "Likey". 

Twice uploaded their first group image teaser for their album on October 19, with the image employing a concept reminiscent of an Instagram post. On October 20, the group made a live broadcast on V Live in celebration of their second anniversary since debut, with the members revealing more details about their upcoming album. The members stated that they participated in the songwriting process, and that a total of 13 tracks will be featured in the album. Additionally, they sang a snippet of the songs "Turtle" and "You in My Heart". On October 21, Twice released a photo of the album's track list, confirming the 13 featured songs and revealing that the lead single "Likey" was produced by Black Eyed Pilseung. It was also revealed that "Missing U" was written by members Dahyun and Chaeyoung, with the latter also writing "Don't Give Up", "24/7" was penned by Nayeon and Jihyo, and "Love Line" was written by Jeongyeon. The group's senior labelmate and former Wonder Girls member Hyerim was also confirmed to have participated in the writing and composition for the track "Look at Me". 

Twice then posted a second group image teaser on October 23. On October 24, the group posted individual teaser images for each member. A second set of teasers featuring moving images for each member were uploaded on the same day. The following day, individual teaser videos featuring Nayeon, Jihyo, and Mina were uploaded by the group. On October 26, Twice released individual teaser videos featuring Jeongyeon, Momo, and Tzuyu. Then on October 27, the last set of individual teaser videos which featured Sana, Dahyun, and Chaeyoung were uploaded. The group uploaded their first music video teaser for "Likey" on October 28. A second music video was released later on the same day which revealed a part of the song's point choreography. A highlight medley which featured audio snippets for all tracks in the album was uploaded on October 29. Before the official release of Twicetagram on October 30, the group released a photo revealing the full lyrics of their title track "Likey."

The album, along with the music video for the lead single, was officially released on October 30 as a digital download on various music sites while the physical album was released the following day.

Composition 
Twice's first full-length album features a total of 13 songs. The lead single "Likey" is produced by South Korean producing duo Black Eyed Pilseung, marking the group's fourth collaboration with the duo following "Like Ooh-Ahh", "Cheer Up", and "TT". The song was described to have a future pop nature, lyrically inspired by social media culture with the members singing about following ideal beauty standards in an effort to attract the "like" of their romantic interests.

"Turtle" is a track employing acoustic-pop for its sonic base, and is described as being "modeled to sound like a fandom-dedicated track". It lyrically describes the romantic concerns between two people, wherein the person who is unable to express their feelings towards the other is compared to a turtle. Members Dahyun and Chaeyoung wrote the rap for the song "Missing U", which notably employed the use of a guitar. It was also composed by Earattack, who had previously worked with groups including Got7 and BTS. "Wow" is produced by Pop Time who is notable for working with Block B and Zico, and is described as an uptempo track that has a jazz base while being infused with a dance beat. "FFW" is a pop song lyrically describing a girl's wish to turn the time and go to the future for their love interest. "Ding Dong" lyrically depicts a high school prom setting, with the subject expressing their belief that a bell rings in the ear when falling in love. "24/7" was jointly written by Nayeon and Jihyo, and lyrically talks about seeking excitement in the middle of a 'boring' and repetitive lifestyle.

Twice's senior labelmate Hyerim participated in the songwriting and composition for "Look At Me", and was described as an upbeat pop-dance track. "Rollin" marked British producer Fox Stevenson's first participation in a K-pop song, with the track being described as having retro inspirations that lyrically talks about one's distress towards a friend who shows a fickle feeling. "Love Line" is penned by member Jeongyeon which lyrically depicts a shy confession of love. "Don't Give Up" is a track talking about self-confidence which is written by Chaeyoung. "You in My Heart" features the usage of an electric guitar, piano, and synth music, while lyrically stating one's gratitude for receiving love. The album's closing track "Jaljayo Good Night" is described as an acoustic ballad song, and was composed for the group's fanbase to listen to at the end of their day.

Promotion 

On October 10, 2017, it was announced that Twice would film an episode of Weekly Idol as start of their full scale activities for the album. The group's appearance on the program was broadcast on November 1. 

On the day of the album's release, Twice held a media showcase at the Yes24 Live Hall in Gwangjin-gu, Seoul. It was followed by a live showcase broadcast through Naver V Live, two hours after dropping the album online, where they performed "Likey" and "Turtle" for the first time, as well as hit songs from their previous albums including "Cheer Up", "TT", and "Knock Knock", among others. 

The group promoted their album by performing on several South Korean music show programs, beginning with M Countdown on November 2. This was followed with performances on KBS2's Music Bank on November 3, SBS' Inkigayo on November 5, and on MBC M's Show Champion on November 8, among other performance dates. The album's title track "Likey" earned a total of seven music show wins, gaining its last win on Inkigayo on November 26.

Critical reception 
Twicetagram was included on Billboards "20 Best K-pop Albums of 2017: Critics' Picks" list. It placed at number 19 and was described as "an entire collection of incredible bubblegum hits". The album was also included in Affinity magazine's "Top 10 Best K-pop Albums of 2017" list, ranking at number 9. Writer Brianda Flores writes that the material shows "how much [Twice] improved from their first works". The Kraze magazine left a positive review for the album, giving it a rating of 9 out of 10 points, praising the production work and variety of genres featured in the material, citing the lead single "Likey" and the B-sides "Turtle", "Wow", and "Look At Me" to be the album's highlights.

Writing for IZM, critic Jo Hae-ram gave Twicetagram a rating of 3 out of 5 points, comparing the album to "having a bite of fresh fruit". The material was described to be a "fairly solid musical perfection", stating the album to be a clever work that manages to accurately focus on Twice's unique colors, but finding the group's 'immature' expressiveness as a regret. Jo cited the songs "Likey", "Turtle", "24/7", "Love Line", and "You in My Heart" to be the album's highlights, praising their production and composition, but having a mixed review for the track "Rollin", calling it to be 'awkward'.

Commercial performance 
Twicetagram recorded over 330,000 stock pre-orders before its release, becoming Twice's best pre-order record until it was surpassed by their succeeding release, What Is Love?, in 2018. Upon half a day of its release, Twicetagram charted within the Top 5 of the US iTunes real-time charts. The album debuted atop the Weekly Gaon Album Chart. The album and its lead single "Likey" also debuted atop both Billboard's World Albums and World Digital Song Sales respectively—the group's first number 1, making Twice the first female K-pop act to simultaneously lead on both charts. They also rose on Billboards Heatseekers Albums chart as the album debuted at number 10, one position higher than Signal's peak at number 11.

It reached 100,000 unit sales within three days of its release, becoming the fastest-selling album by a K-pop girl group since 2002, with over 129,000 copies sold in its first week. The album became the second best-selling album on Gaon for the month of October, selling 276,575 physical copies. It is also the best-selling K-pop girl group album of 2017, which sold 320,389 copies at year-end.

Track listing

Personnel 
Credits adapted from album liner notes.

 J. Y. Park "The Asiansoul" – producer
 Black Eyed Pilseung – co-producer
 Jeon Gun – co-producer
 Lee Eun-hee – album art directing and design (A&R)
 Choi Hye-jin – recording, mixing and assistant mixing engineer
 Eom Se-hee – recording and assistant mixing engineer
 Jang Han-soo – recording and assistant mixing engineer
 Jeong Ho-hyun – recording engineer, all instruments and keyboard (on "Turtle" and "You in My Heart")
 Earattack – recording engineer, and all instruments and computer programming (on "Missing U" and "Rollin'")
 bass (on "Missing U"), background vocals (on "Rollin'") and director (on "Don't Give Up")
 Jeong Gyu-chang – recording engineer
 Kevin Oppa (mr. cho) – recording engineer, vocals producer (on "Love Line"), computer programming, piano and digital editing (on "Jaljayo Good Night")
 Frants – recording engineer, all instruments and computer programming (on "Look at Me")
 Lee Tae-seob – mixing engineer
 Lim Hong-jin – mixing and assistant mixing engineer
 Staytuned – mixing engineer
 Yoon Won-kwon – mixing engineer
 Jossi Ahjussi – mixing engineer
 Jeon Bu-yeon – assistant mixing engineer
 Bae So-yoon – assistant mixing engineer
 Chris Gehringer – mastering engineer
 Kwon Nam-woo – mastering engineer
 Naive Production – video director
 Kim Young-jo – video executive producer
 Yoo Seung-woo – video executive producer
 Choi Pyeong-gang – video co-producer
 Jeong Ji-eun at Agency VOTT – photographer
 Choi Hee-seon at F. Choi – style director
 Lim Ji-hyeon at F. Choi – style director
 Son Eun-hee at Lulu – hair director
 Jung Nan-young at Lulu – hair director
 Choi Ji-young at Lulu – hair director
 Jo Sang-ki at Lulu – makeup director
 Zia at Lulu – makeup director
 Jeon Dal-lae at Lulu – makeup director
 Today Art – printing
 Rado – all instruments, computer programming and background vocals (on "Likey")
 Jihyo of Twice – background vocals (on "Likey", "Ding Dong" and "Love Line")
 Nayeon of Twice – background vocals (on "Likey")
 Choi Hoon – bass (on "Turtle" and "You in My Heart")
 Yoon Tae-woong – guitar (on "Turtle" and "You in My Heart")
 Kim Yoon-ji – chorus (on "Turtle")
 Kim Jong-seong – guitar (on "Missing U")
 Nam Joo – background vocals (on "Missing U", "FFW" and "Rollin'")
 Jeong Yoo-ra at Cassette08 – digital editing (on "Missing U", "Rollin'" and "Don't Give Up")
 Jeong Dong-hwan & Park Ji-yong & Nusoul – keyboards (on "Wow")
 Kriz – background vocals (on "Wow")
 Park Gi-tae – guitar (on "Wow")
 NAOtheLAIZA – all instruments and computer programming (on "FFW")
 Antti Hynninen – all instruments and computer programming (on "Ding Dong")
 Caesar & Loui – all  instruments and computer programming (on "24/7")
 Jowul – vocal director and background vocals (on "24/7")
 Oh Han-sol – background vocals (on "Look at Me")
 Hyerim – background vocals (on "Look at Me")
 Fox Stevenson – all instruments and computer programming (on "Rollin'")
 Bin – background vocals (on "Rollin'" and "Don't Give Up")
 Darren Smith – all instruments and computer programming (on "Love Line")
 Chris Wahle – all instruments and computer programming (on "Don't Give Up")
 Kim So-ri – chorus (on "You in My Heart")
 Kim Jun-soo – guitar (on "Jaljayo Good Night")
 Lee Da-jeong – background vocals (on "Jaljayo Good Night")

Locations 

Recording
 JYPE Studios, Seoul, South Korea
 E.one Sound, Seoul, South Korea
 Heavymental Studios, Seoul, South Korea
 NUPLAY Studio, Seoul, South Korea
 Studio567, Seoul, South Korea
 Banzak Studio, Seoul, South Korea

Mixing
 JYPE Studios, Seoul, South Korea
 Studio Sean, Seoul, South Korea
 Cube Studio, Seoul, South Korea

Mastering
 Sterling Sound, New York City, New York
 821 Sound Mastering, Seoul, South Korea

Charts

Weekly charts

Year-end charts

Release history

See also 
 List of Gaon Album Chart number ones of 2017

Notes

References 

2017 debut albums
Dance-pop albums by South Korean artists
Genie Music albums
JYP Entertainment albums
Korean-language albums
Twice (group) albums